Fandoqlu (also Romanized as Fandoqlū; also known as Qandoqlū) is a village in Kandovan Rural District, Kandovan District, Meyaneh County, East Azerbaijan Province, Iran. At the 2006 census, its population was 326, in 81 families.

References 

Populated places in Meyaneh County